Marina DeBris is the name used by an Australian-based artist whose work focuses on reusing trash to raise awareness of ocean and beach pollution. DeBris uses trash washed up from the beach to create trashion, 'fish tanks', decorative art and other works of art. She has also used beach trash to provide one perspective on what the earth might look like from space. As well as creating art from debris, DeBris also is a fund raiser for environmental organizations,  and collaborates with non-profit organizations and schools to educate children about ocean pollution. In 2021, DeBris found almost 300 face masks on beaches, and used them in her trashion and other displays.

DeBris is also a social activist. In 2011 she participated in a panel on how artists can contribute to environmental public policy, promoting clean energy and curating eco-art exhibitions.  DeBris has worked with non profits to raise funds for art education. DeBris is listed with the Women Environmental Artists Directory.

Education and personal life 
DeBris was educated at Indiana University and the Rhode Island School of Design. She has lived and worked in New York City, London, England, and Sydney, Australia. She was born in Detroit, had lived in Los Angeles, and currently lives in Australia

Genre and venues 
Works by DeBris are often displayed in galleries, in a maritime museum, Sculpture by the Sea, featured in magazines, included in science events, included in the Smithsonian Institution’s Washed Ashore Project, and has been used by organizations such as the United Nations as awards.   Her works are also displayed in venues not typically thought of as galleries, but are art venues nonetheless, such as retail venues, Burning Man, a trasher's ball,  a downtown art walk, an Earth Day creek spring clean-up, and an Environmental & Animal Justice Exhibit. Marina's Inconvenience Store has won three awards at the 2017 Sculpture by the Sea and is now a traveling exhibition. Marina is included in the Bondi Story Room, which is owned and managed by the Waverley Council.

DeBris also partners or works with various anti-pollution organizations, such as Friends of Ballona Wetlands, 5 Gyres, RuckusRoots, the United Nations Special Assembly on Climate Change Heal the Bay and other organizations, such as Aquarium of the Pacific. Marina DeBris has also designed accessories for Captain Charles J. Moore, who worked to bring attention to the Great Pacific Garbage Patch. DeBris' work with the United Nations Special Assembly was a collaboration with actress/poet Sheryl Lee, dancer Maya Gabay, and musician Marla Leigh.

DeBris also partnered with an office building, MLC Centre, to highlight the problems of throwaway coffee cups. The MLC Centre hosted her work "Disposable Truths" created from used throwaway coffee cups.

Awards 
DeBris's "Inconvenience Store" was a joint recipients of the Allens People's Choice Award at the 2017 Sculpture By the Sea. The "Inconvenience Store" was also awarded with the Sydney Water Environmental Sculpture Subsidy for her work on water pollution and consumption, and won the Waverley Council Mayor's Prize. Marina also won the Helen Lempriere Scholarship. Marina was also a 2016 Waverley Council studio artist.

References

External links 
Washed Up 
Discovering women who inspire Interview with Marina DeBris

Environmental artists
Australian contemporary artists
Australian women artists